The 2020 Singapore Premier League season is Tampines Rovers's 25th season at the top level of Singapore football and 75th year in existence as a football club. The club will also compete in the Singapore League Cup, Singapore Cup, Singapore Community Shield and the AFC Cup.

Squad

Sleague

U19

Coaching staff

Transfers

Pre-season

In

Out

Note 1: Shahdan Sulaiman's contract end at 2021 but transferred to Home United for undisclosed fee.

Note 2: Zulfadhmi Suzliman's contract end at 2020 but transferred to Balestier Khalsa for undisclosed fee.

Extension and retained

Promoted

Mid-season transfers

In

Out

Friendlies

Pre-season 

Leo Cup 2020 Thailand - 26 to 30 January

Team statistics

Appearances and goals

Note
4 Player scored 4 goals
5 Player scored 5 goals

Competitions

Overview

Charity Shield 
Hougang United was a last minute replacement for DPMM FC after DPMM pulled out from the Charity Shield due to COVID-19.

Singapore Premier League

Singapore Cup

AFC Champions League

Qualifying play-off

AFC Cup

Group stage

See also 
 2014 Tampines Rovers FC season
 2015 Tampines Rovers FC season
 2016 Tampines Rovers FC season
 2017 Tampines Rovers FC season
 2018 Tampines Rovers FC season
 2019 Tampines Rovers FC season

Notes

References 

Tampines Rovers FC
Tampines Rovers FC seasons
2020 in Asian association football leagues